Remix Collection is a rare CD only released in Japan containing special alternate versions of songs from CeCe Peniston's first two albums Finally and Thought 'Ya Knew. Many of these versions were exclusively available on vinyl and were never released on CD. The album featured nine alternate versions previously available only on vinyl and was issued on CD in Japan in 1994.

The album mapped singer's three number one hits achieved in the Billboard Hot Dance Music/Club Play chart, including "Keep On Walkin'", "I'm in the Mood" and "Hit by Love, as well as her other Top 10 singles (like "I'm Not Over You" and "Keep Givin' Me Your Love"), which successfully scored also on the US R&B, as well as in the Hot 100 or the UK Top 75.

Track listing

Credits and personnel

References

General

Specific

External links
 

CeCe Peniston compilation albums
CeCe Peniston remix albums
1994 remix albums
1994 greatest hits albums
A&M Records albums
A&M Records remix albums